The Moon rabbit or Moon hare is a mythical figure in East Asian and indigenous American folklore, based on pareidolic interpretations that identify the dark markings on the near side of the Moon as a rabbit or hare. In East Asia, the rabbit is seen as pounding with a mortar and pestle, but the contents of the mortar differ among Chinese, Japanese, Korean and Vietnamese folklore.  In Chinese folklore, the rabbit is often portrayed as a companion of the Moon goddess Chang'e, constantly pounding the elixir of life for her and some show the making of cakes or rice cakes; but in Japanese and Korean versions, the rabbit is pounding the ingredients for mochi or some other type of rice cakes; in the Vietnamese version, the Moon rabbit often appears with Hằng Nga and Chú Cuội, and like the Chinese version, the Vietnamese Moon rabbit also pounding the elixir of immortality in the mortar. In some Chinese versions, the rabbit pounds medicine for the mortals and some include making of mooncakes. Moon folklore from certain Amerindian cultures of North America also has rabbit themes and characters.

History 

An early Chinese source called the Chu Ci, a Western Han anthology of Chinese poems from the Warring States period, notes that along with a toad, there is a hare on the Moon who constantly pounds herbs for the immortals. This notion is supported by later texts, including the Song-era Taiping Imperial Reader. As rabbits were not yet introduced to China during Western Han, the original image was not a rabbit but a hare.

Han Dynasty poets call the hare on the Moon the "Jade Hare" (玉兔) or the "Gold Hare" (金兔), and these phrases were used often, in place of the word for the Moon. A famous poet of Tang China, Li Bai, relates how "The rabbit in the moon pounds the medicine in vain" in his poem, "The Old Dust".

Asian folklore 

In the Buddhist Jataka tales, Tale 316 relates that a monkey, an otter, a jackal, and a rabbit resolved to practice charity on the day of the full moon (Uposatha), believing a demonstration of great virtue would earn a great reward. When an old man begged for food from them, the monkey gathered fruits from the trees and the otter collected fish, while the jackal found a lizard and a pot of milk-curd. Knowing only how to gather grass, the rabbit instead offered its own body by throwing itself into a fire the man had prepared. However, the rabbit was not burnt and the old man revealed that he was Śakra. Touched by the rabbit's virtue, he drew the likeness of the rabbit on the Moon for all to see. It is said the lunar image is still draped in the smoke that rose when the rabbit cast itself into the fire. The rabbit is believed to be a Bodhisattva.

A version of this story may be found in the Japanese anthology, Konjaku Monogatarishū, where the rabbit's companions are instead a fox and a monkey.

The Moon rabbit legend is popular and part of local folklore throughout Asia. It may be found in diverse cultures in China, Japan, India, Korea, Sri Lanka, Cambodia, Thailand, Vietnam, and Myanmar.

This legend also gave rise to the Mid-Autumn Festivals of China, Tết Trung Thu of Vietnam, Tsukimi of Japan, and Chuseok of Korea, Sampeah Preah Khae in Cambodia, all of which celebrate the legend of the Moon rabbit. In Vietnamese mythology, the Jade Rabbit on the Moon is often accompanied by the Moon Lady and Cuội, who sits under a magical banyan. The trio has become the personifications of the holiday, when they descend to the mortal world and give out cellophane lanterns, mooncakes and gifts to children.

North American folklore 

Presumed to be arising likewise, through lunar pareidolia, legends of Moon rabbits also exist among some indigenous cultures of North and Central America.

In Mayan art, glyphs, hieroglyphics, and inscriptions, a rabbit frequently is shown with the Moon Goddess and another deity related to the Moon.

According to an Aztec legend, the god Quetzalcoatl, then living on Earth as a human, started on a journey and, after walking for a long time, became hungry and tired. With no food or water around, he thought he would die. Then a rabbit grazing nearby offered herself as food to save his life. Quetzalcoatl, moved by the rabbit's noble offering, elevated her to the Moon, then lowered her back to Earth and told her, "You may be just a rabbit, but everyone will remember you; there is your image in light, for all people and for all times."

Another Mesoamerican legend tells of the brave and noble sacrifice of Nanahuatzin during the creation of the fifth sun. Humble Nanahuatzin sacrificed himself in fire to become the new sun, but the wealthy god Tecciztecatl hesitated four times before he finally set himself alight to become the Moon. Due to Tecciztecatl's cowardice, the deities felt that the Moon should not be so bright as the Sun, so one of the deities threw a rabbit at his face to diminish his light. Another version of the legend says that Tecciztecatl was in the form of a rabbit when he sacrificed himself to become the Moon, casting his shadow there.

In Canada and the United States, a Cree cultural legend tells a different story, about a young rabbit who wished to ride the Moon. Only the crane was willing to take him there. The trip stretched the crane's legs as the heavy rabbit held them tightly, leaving them elongated as the legs of all cranes are now. When they reached the Moon, the rabbit touched the crane's head with a bleeding paw, leaving the red mark cranes wear to this day. According to the legend, on clear nights, Rabbit still may be seen riding the Moon.

Modern references

Spaceflight 
 The Chinese lunar rover, Yutu, that landed on the Moon on December 14, 2013 was named after the Jade Rabbit, as a result of an online poll, and was followed up by a second rover, Yutu-2 which deployed on the far-side of the Moon on 3 Jan 2019.
 The Moon rabbit was the subject of a humorous conversation between NASA mission control and the crew of Apollo 11:
Houston: Among the large headlines concerning Apollo this morning, is one asking that you watch for a lovely girl with a big rabbit. An ancient legend says a beautiful Chinese girl called Chang-E has been living there for 4,000 years. It seems she was banished to the Moon because she stole the pill of immortality from her husband. You might also look for her companion, a large Chinese rabbit, who is easy to spot since he is always standing on his hind feet in the shade of a cinnamon tree. The name of the rabbit is not reported.
Michael Collins: Okay. We'll keep a close eye out for the bunny girl.

Arts

Comics and animation 
 The eponymous Sailor Moon'''s human name is Usagi Tsukino, a pun on 月のうさぎ (Rom. Tsuki no usagi), which means Moon Rabbit in Japanese. Her daughter's name, Chibiusa, means little rabbit.
 In centrally Naruto final arc, antagonistic Kaguya Ōtsutsuki is based on the Rabbit of the Moon, according to which a rabbit can be seen in the markings of the Moon, brewing the Elixir of Life for the Moon Goddess. According to the Buddhist legend.
 The Moon rabbit theme makes an appearance in the "Legend of the Stars" section of the Kamen Rider Spirits manga, told by Sergei Koribanof to his son Masim.
 In the Dragon Ball animation, Son Goku fights against the Rabbit Gang and solves the issue presented in the episode by taking the enemy leader, Monster Carrot, an anthropomorphic rabbit who turns anyone he touches into a carrot, and his human companions, to the Moon, where they are seen pounding rice cake mixture.
 In the Problem Children Are Coming from Another World, Aren't They? anime, the character Black Rabbit is a Moon rabbit, with several references to the legends.
 In the movie Over the Moon, there is a rabbit called 'Jade' and he is the companion of the goddess Chang'e. The rabbit is also green like jade. 
In the manga Thus Spoke Kishibe Rohan - Episode 4: The Harvest Moon a supernatural creature by the name of The Moon Rabbit (月の兎 Tsuki no Usagi) is responsible for the curse of the Mochizuki family.
In the anime Saint Seiya episode 60 Shiryu remembers an old fable of a rabbit sacrificing its life to save a traveler, and it resembles Shun's destiny of Andromeda, who sacrificed her life to save her people.          
In the Korean webcomic The God of Highschool the Moon rabbit is one of the four pillars of fate.
The Japanese anime Madö King Granzört has characters who are humanoids with rabbit ears and they are natives of the Moon.
In the anime My Hero Academia Rumi Usagiyama is a Hero with the rabbit quirk. Her ultimate attack names all start with the word "Luna".

 Literature 
 In a scene in the sixteenth century Chinese novel, Journey to the West, Sun Wukong fights the Moon Rabbit.
 Douglas Wood wrote Rabbit and the Moon (1998), an adaption of the Cree legend.

 Live-action television 
 The kaiju Lunaticks is based on the Moon Rabbit. He appears in the Tokusatsu series, Ultraman Ace as one of the series' 'Terrible-Monsters' under the command of its main antagonist, Yapool. Lunaticks's connection to the Moon Rabbit is further highlighted when it is revealed that he was responsible for draining the Moon of its magma (which was also the home of one of Ace's co-hosts, Yuko Minami), transforming it into a barren wasteland.

 Music 
 The American electronic music act, Rabbit in the Moon, founded in 1991, gets its name from this legend.
 The singer/composer Cosmo Sheldrake references the rabbit in the moon in their song "The Moss"
 The German band, Tarwater, released the albums Rabbit Moon and Rabbit Moon Revisited.
 The American emo act, Jets to Brazil, has a song "Perfecting Loneliness" that features the Apollo recording discussing the legend.
 The British band Happy Graveyard Orchestra published "The Moon Rabbit", a mini suite inspired by the folklore, in 2015.
 The Italian band, Moonlight Haze, has a song "The Rabbit of the Moon", inspired by the Japanese legend.
 English musician David Bowie wore a jumpsuit portraying Moon rabbits designed by Kansai Yamamoto during his Ziggy Stardust Tour.
American singer-songwriter Clairo references "the rabbit moon" in her song, Reaper.
Korean boy band, Big Bang references the tale of the rabbit on the moon in their music video “Still Life”
Telugu song 'Chandrullo unde kundelu' from the movie Nuvvostanante Nenoddantana references the rabbit on the moon.

 Stage 
 The rabbit in the Moon is a major theme in the 2011 musical, South Street, with the rabbit appearing prominently in the Moon clock in Sammy's bar, and the main character being advised to "Look to the rabbit" for inspiration.

 Video games 
Many video games have major characters based on the tale, including Reisen Udongein Inaba and the other Lunarians (some of whom pound Moon mochi to be made into magic medicine) from the Touhou Project series, the Broodals from Super Mario Odyssey, and Chang'e and the Jade Rabbit/Moon Rabbit are featured as playable characters in the video game Smite. In Final Fantasy IV, the myths serve as the inspiration for a race of rabbit-like humanoid inhabitants of the Moon called Hummingways which, in turn, are the inspiration for the Loporrit race in Final Fantasy XIV: Endwalker, also inspired by the Moon rabbits.

The Jade Rabbit is the name of a scout rifle in the Destiny series of games. In Destiny 2, players can visit the Moon and find miniature statues of chibi-styled jade rabbit dolls which accept offerings of rice cake.

A Moon Rabbit Cookie was added to Cookie Run: Kingdom on September 17, 2021.

The Moon Rabbit Dragon is a dragon in the dragon breeding game Dragon Mania Legends.

 See also 

 List of fictional rabbits and hares
 Lunar pareidolia
 Man in the Moon
 Rabbits and hares in art
 Rabbits in culture and literature
 Tecciztecatl
 Tu'er Ye
 Lunar mare

 Notes 

 References 

 External links 

 Kazumaro, Kanbe. "Buddhist sayings in everyday life – Tsuki no Usagi". Otani University. 2005. Retrieved on July 25, 2007.
 Varma. C.B. "The Hare on the Moon". The Illustrated Jataka & Other Stories of the Buddha''. 2002. Retrieved on July 25, 2007.
 「與月為伴 愉閱中秋」, Taipei Public Library. 2006. Retrieved on July 25, 2007. 
 Wood, Douglas – "Rabbit and the Moon"
 Daigo, Shoji. "When and how did Japanese jade rabbit begin to pound rice cake?". JAXA/ISAS. 2022. Retrieved on September 1, 2022.
 Daigo, Shoji. "History and Culture of Hare/Rabbit on the Moon (Jade Rabbit)". Retrieved on September 1, 2022.

Animals in Buddhism
Aztec legendary creatures
Chinese legendary creatures
Cree legendary creatures
Fiction set on the Moon
Japanese legendary creatures
Jataka tales
Korean legendary creatures
Maya legendary creatures
Moon myths
Mythological rabbits and hares
Vietnamese legendary creatures